Osmodes adosus, the adosus white-spots, is a butterfly in the family Hesperiidae. It is found in Sierra Leone, Liberia, Ivory Coast, Ghana, Nigeria, Cameroon, Gabon, the Republic of the Congo, the Democratic Republic of the Congo, Uganda and north-western Tanzania. The habitat consists of forests.

The larvae feed on Marantochloa species.

References

Butterflies described in 1890
Erionotini
Butterflies of Africa